Kluge is a German-derived surname. In German, capitalizing, and adding a final  to, the adjective  (meaning "clever"), creates a noun meaning "clever one". Although the adjective  is a feminine form, the noun  can be feminine, neuter or masculine.

Those bearing it include:

 Alexander Kluge (born 1932) – German film director and author
 Alexandra Kluge (1937–2017) – German actor
 Arnold G. Kluge (retired 2003) – American zoologist and herpetologist
 Friedrich Kluge (1856–1926) – German linguist
 Günther von Kluge (1882–1944) – German field marshal
 H. Jürgen Kluge (born 1941) – German physicist
 John Werner Kluge (1914–2010) – German-American media entrepreneur and philanthropist
 P. F. Kluge (born 1942) – German-American author
 Peer Kluge (born 1980) – German footballer
 Roger Kluge – German racing cyclist
 Walter Kluge (fl. 1930s) – German luger
 Wolfgang von Kluge (1892–1976) – German World War II general
 Eike-Henner Kluge – Canadian German ethicist

See also 
 Klug
 Kludge

Surnames from nicknames